Binola was an unincorporated community in Wood County, West Virginia, United States.

References 
Is a town in the film Joe Kidd. Starring Clint Eastwood.

Unincorporated communities in West Virginia
Unincorporated communities in Wood County, West Virginia